James Arreak (born October 6, 1952) is a territorial and municipal level politician in Canada. He has served as a member of both the Nunavut and Northwest Territories legislatures.

Biography 
Arreak is from Clyde River, Nunavut, Canada.

Arreak was elected to the Northwest Territories Legislature in the 1979 Northwest Territories general election. He won the Baffin South electoral district defeating incumbent Ipeelee Kilabuk. He left the legislature less than a year later in 1980.

He was the Member of the Legislative Assembly (MLA) for the electoral district of Uqqummiut having won the seat in the 2004 Nunavut election. In June 2006 he was appointed deputy speaker for the Legislative Assembly.

In 2008 he was elected Speaker of the Legislative Assembly of Nunavut. He resigned from this position in November 2010 to become Minister of Culture, Language, Elders, and Youth and Minister of Languages in the Cabinet of Nunavut. He was replaced as Speaker by former premier Paul Okalik.

Arreak was at one time mayor of Clyde River.

References

External links
. Biography at the Legislative Assembly of Nunavut

1952 births
Living people
Inuit from the Northwest Territories
Inuit politicians
Members of the Legislative Assembly of Nunavut
21st-century Canadian politicians
Members of the Legislative Assembly of the Northwest Territories
Mayors of places in Nunavut
Mayors of places in the Northwest Territories
People from Clyde River
Speakers of the Legislative Assembly of Nunavut
Inuit from Nunavut